Redcon-1 (also known as Redcon-1 - Army of the Dead) is a 2018 British action horror film, starring Katarina Waters, Mark Strange, and Carlos Gallardo. The film was produced by Gallardo and Kevin Eastman. Working titles for the film included Zombie Apocalypse and Zombie City. It is Gallardo's second zombie movie. The film was released in the UK on 28 September 2018.

Redcon-1 centers around a joint British-American Special Forces team, trying to save a scientist from the clutches of death during a mass zombie outbreak. Unlike traditional zombies from similar franchises, the zombies in this film have retained certain human traits, being able to fight back, and use weapons.

Redcon-1 was the first movie director Chee Keong Cheung had shot in nearly a decade for his Intense Productions company.

The film received mixed reviews, though has found a cult base of horror fans that united behind its UK release.

Plot
In Britain, a virus has swept the country, turning people into zombies.  The virus has spread from a breakout from a prison in the south of England.  A joint British-American special forces squad goes into the quarantine zone to extract Dr. Julian Raynes, a scientist who is meant to have the possibility of making a cure. There are four possible locations he might be in. The group, made up of Captain Stanton, Lieutenant Perez, Paige, Rodrigo and several others, enter the first location by assault craft on the river. They encounter the first zombies and discover that they are not like the normal zombie genre and are more intelligent, capable of hand-to-hand combat and utilizing objects. The first location is overrun by zombies, and they manage to fight their way out and find some combat vehicles that they use to get to the second location - a set of high-rise flats.

The flats are overrun with zombies, and they make it to the room they need on the nearly top floor, the scientist not there again, but disaster soon strikes, when the biggest guy on the team, Jacob, is bitten during a struggle. Jacob commits suicide via gunshot to avoid zombification. They spot vehicles full of zombie soldiers who have maintained their military capabilities. The squad hide out amongst a pile of dead zombie corpses, but Private Bernstein is captured and taken away on a truck.  They follow the vehicles using the tracking signal from Bernstein and discover a zombie army camp where there are a large number of zombie soldiers fully kitted out in CBRN hazmat suits. They discover their missing soldier being held in a container with other survivors - including two female civilians and Dr. Raynes.

After rescuing everyone in the container, they are confronted by the zombie soldiers and a firefight occurs with many survivors being killed by the zombies shooting them. After managing to get away, they interrogate Raynes. Meanwhile the squad’s commanding officer, Major General Smith, discusses the outbreak with the rest of his command staff and it turns out that his own son is infected and that they are still experimenting on other zombies. After taking shelter in a bunker, Paige admits to her boyfriend, Rodrigo, that she became infected during an earlier fight when some contaminated blood got in her mouth. He shares a passionate kiss with her anyway, knowing he will be infected like her. They stay behind from the group and head off into the countryside. They also discover that the surviving girl, Alicia, might be immune to the virus.

Stanton, Bernstein, Perez, and Alicia arrive at the pickup point where Smith tells them that he has had to kill his son and there is no cure. Smith blamed Raynes and wanted vengeance against science and modern technology in the hopes of spreading the virus further as an airborne disease. Smith shoots Raynes and gets back to the helicopter whilst a firefight ensues between his security detail and the survivors. Perez is injured and it is revealed Bernstein was blackmailed by Smith to gather intelligence due to his parents being held captive. Perez remains behind to fight a horde but is outmatched and devoured. Stanton and Alicia are captured by the prison group, and it turns out that Alicia is the daughter of the leader of the rioters, Jimmy, who died after escaping earlier in the film. Jimmy was earlier revealed to have at least partial immunity from the virus. While Stanton is checking Alicia's bit it is revealed that she has scars from being bitten previously. He knows from the journal and a previous conversation that Jimmy was partially immune, and correctly deduces that Alicia is totally immune and can hold a cure against the virus. Stanton decides to try to get to the free zone and secure an alliance from a group of armed survivors who are near the border. They meet the survivors and discover Private Bernstein with them. Stanton explains the military’s plan to bomb the quarantine zone and then replace it with a dictatorial government (with Smith as its ruler), and the survivors agree to help him cross the border.

At the border they fight a very large group of zombies and are joined by the prison gang who decided to aid them.  Once they get through to the border crossing, Smith arrives and tells his men to kill everyone, but before the military can open fire, a fight ensues between him and a zombified Stanton, who manages to defeat the General. During the aftermath, Stanton is given a mercy killing by Bernstein, and Alicia is extracted from the quarantine zone, adopted by Bernstein in the process after returning from his mission.

Cast
 Katarina Waters as Sgt Kira Paige
 Mark Strange as Lt Frank Perez
 Carlos Gallardo as Sgt Frederick Reeves
 Akira Koieyama as Sgt Simon Lau
 Oris Erhuero as Capt Marcus Stanton 
 Martyn Ford as Cpl Jacob Gallagher
 Joshua Dickinson as Pvt Perry Bernstein 
 Michael Sheehan as Lt Rodrigo Gonzalez
 Douglas Russell as Ivan Gavric
 Nicolette McKeown as Young Woman Stranded
 Peter Anderson as Infected
 Dougie Rankin as Zombie
 Meredith Whiting as Zombie

Production 
The film was shot in locations throughout both Scotland (Newtongrange, HM Prison Peterhead, Glasgow, and Ayrshire) and England (Brownsover etc.). Many locals in various cities across the UK answered casting calls to be extras, portraying the infected, the troops, gang members, and various other survivors. English amputee Olivia Story made her film debut as a zombie who removed her prosthetic limbs for a scene, and she appears alongside her father, who introduced her to acting.

Reception

Critical response 
According to the Movie and Television Review and Classification Board of the Philippines (MTRCB), the film contains numerous scenes depicting brutal and graphic violence and gore, and nudity and sexual activity. The Board find it not suitable for viewers below eighteen (18) years of age. The MTRCB classified the film as rated R-18.

Home media

The film was released on DVD on 25 February 2019.

Sequel

In a Facebook post on 25 March 2019, the producer requested fan feedback regarding a sequel.

References

External links
 
 
 

2018 films
2018 horror films
2010s action horror films
British action horror films
British post-apocalyptic films
British zombie films
Films about the British Armed Forces
Films about the United States Army
Films set in England
Films set in prison
Films about viral outbreaks
2010s English-language films
2010s British films